The Second Anglo-Maratha War (1803–1805) was the second conflict between the British East India Company and the Maratha Empire in India.

Background
The British had supported the "fugitive" Peshwa Raghunathrao in the First Anglo-Maratha War, continued with his "fugitive" son, Baji Rao II.  Though not as martial in his courage as his father, the son was "a past master in deceit and intrigue".  Coupled with his "cruel streak", Baji Rao II soon provoked the enmity of Yashwant Rao Holkar when he had one of Holkar's relatives killed.

The Maratha Empire at that time consisted of a confederacy of five major chiefs: the Peshwa (Prime Minister) at the capital city of Poona, the Gaekwad chief of Baroda, the Scindia chief of Gwalior, the Holkar chief of Indore, and the Bhonsale chief of Nagpur. The Maratha chiefs were engaged in internal quarrels among themselves. Lord Mornington, the Governor-General of British India had repeatedly offered a subsidiary treaty to the Peshwa and Scindia, but Nana Fadnavis refused strongly.

In October 1802, the combined armies of Peshwa Baji Rao II and Scindia were defeated by Yashwantrao Holkar, ruler of Indore, at the Battle of Poona. Baji Rao fled to British protection, and in December the same year concluded the Treaty of Bassein with the British East India Company, ceding territory for the maintenance of a subsidiary force and agreeing to treaty with no other power. The treaty would become the "death knell of the Maratha Empire".

War

This act on the part of the Peshwa, their nominal overlord, horrified and disgusted the Maratha chieftains; in particular, the Scindia rulers of Gwalior and the Bhonsale rulers of Nagpur and Berar contested the agreement.

The British strategy included Arthur Wellesley securing the Deccan Plateau, Lake taking Doab and then Delhi, Powell entering Bundelkhand, Murray taking Badoch, and Harcourt neutralizing Bihar.  The British had available over 53,000 men to help accomplish their goals.

With the logistic assembly of his army complete (24,000 men in total) Wellesley gave the order to break camp and attack the nearest Maratha fort on 8 August 1803. On the same day he took the walled Pettah of Ahmednagar (town adjacent to the fort) by escalade.

The Ahmednagar Fort surrendered on 12 August after an infantry attack had exploited an artillery-made breach in the wall. With the pettah and fort now in British control Wellesley was able to extend control southwards to the river Godavari.

In September 1803, Scindia forces lost to Lord Gerard Lake at Delhi and to Wellesley at Assaye. On 18 October, British forces took the pettah of Asirgarh Fort with a loss of two killed and five wounded. The fort's garrison subsequently surrendered on the 21st after the attackers had erected a battery. British artillery pounded ancient ruins used by Scindia forces as forward operating bases, eroding their control. In November, Lake defeated another Scindia force at Laswari, followed by Wellesley's victory over Bhonsle forces at Argaon (now Adgaon) on 29 November 1803.

Conclusion
On 17 December 1803, Raghoji II Bhonsale of Nagpur signed the Treaty of Deogaon in Odisha with the British after the Battle of Argaon and gave up the province of Cuttack (which included Mughal and the coastal part of Odisha, Garjat/the princely states of Odisha, Balasore Port, parts of Midnapore district of West Bengal).

On 30 December 1803, the Daulat Scindia signed the Treaty of Surji-Anjangaon with the British after the Battle of Assaye and Battle of Laswari and ceded to the British, Hisar, Panipat, Rohtak, Rewari, Gurgaon, Ganges-Jumna Doab, the Delhi-Agra region, parts of Bundelkhand, Broach, some districts of Gujarat and the fort of Ahmmadnagar.

The British started hostilities against Yashwantrao Holkar on 6 April 1804. Yashwantrao was somewhat  successful as he harassed the British forces by guerilla warfare. However, he didn't receive the expected help from Scindia who had already signed a treaty with the British. He went to Punjab and sought Ranjeet Singh's help with no success. The lack of resources compelled him to come to terms with British.

The Treaty of Rajghat, signed on 24 December 1805, forced Holkar to give up Tonk, Rampura, and Bundi.

See also
 Alexander Adams
 Fort of Ahmednagar
 List of Maratha dynasties and states
 Pettah of Ahmednagar
 Third Anglo-Maratha War

References

Further reading

}

 – historical fiction describing the war

 
Conflicts in 1803
Conflicts in 1804
Conflicts in 1805
Wars involving the British East India Company
Anglo-Maratha War 2
History of Gujarat
1803 in British India
1804 in British India
1805 in British India